Mariem Claret Velazco García (born 9 November 1998 in San Tomé, Anzoátegui) is a Venezuelan model and beauty queen who was crowned Miss International 2018 in Tokyo, Japan. She won both her Miss Venezuela International and Miss International titles on her actual birthday.

Personal life
Velazco was born and raised in San Tomé, Venezuela. She is currently studying Geophysical Engineering, she loves to play tennis and also takes piano lessons. She is originally from the Anzoátegui State but represented Barinas State in the Miss Venezuela pageant.

Pageantry

Miss Venezuela 2017
Velazco stands at 177 centimeters and competed as Miss Barinas 2017. As one of 24 finalists in her country's national competition, she was awarded Best Style and Miss Photogenic at the grand final show of Miss Venezuela 2017. She succeeded outgoing Miss Venezuela 2016 1st Runner-up and Miss International 2017 2nd Runner-up Diana Croce of Nueva Esparta.

Miss International 2018
Velazco was crowned Miss International 2018 by her predecessor Miss International 2017, Kevin Lilliana Junaedy of Indonesia, held in the Tokyo Dome City Hall in Tokyo, Japan on 9 November 2018, coinciding on her 20th birthday anniversary. She showcased a Venezuelan native headdress and an evening gown composed of pearls during her competition.

During the speech portion of the pageant, the women were given a chance to express their plans if crowned Miss International and share their personal advocacies. Velazco's speech went as follows:

"It’s a very special day for all Miss International delegates, but for me, it’s doubly special as today I am also celebrating my birthday. In my country, we have the custom of not revealing our birthday wish, but today I want to make an exception. My dream, my birthday wish is that if I were to be privileged enough to be your next Miss International, I can continue to stimulate children around the world to read. In Venezuela, I have devoted a great part of my time serving as a storyteller for less favored populations, and I’m living proof that reading is the way towards knowledge. My goal as Miss International is that every child around the world have access to books that speak about tolerance, respect, and happiness. I firmly believe in the power of dreams to change societies and think if everyone of us takes on the duty of reading a story to a child, that child will be more educated and the world will be happier. That is my birthday wish."

Her victory gave Venezuela its 8th Miss International crown, the most number of crowns titles won by a single country in the history of the pageant.

References

External links
 Miss Venezuela official website

1998 births
Living people
Venezuelan female models
Venezuelan beauty pageant winners
Miss International winners
Miss International 2018 delegates
People from Anzoátegui